In probability theory — specifically, in stochastic analysis — a killed process is a stochastic process that is forced to assume an undefined or "killed" state at some (possibly random) time.

Definition

Let X : T × Ω → S be a stochastic process defined for "times" t in some ordered index set T, on a probability space (Ω, Σ, P), and taking values in a measurable space S. Let ζ : Ω → T be a random time, referred to as the killing time. Then the killed process Y associated to X is defined by

and Yt is left undefined for t ≥ ζ. Alternatively, one may set Yt = c for t ≥ ζ, where c is a "coffin state" not in S.

See also

 Stopped process

References

  (See Section 8.2)

Stochastic processes